The European qualification for the 2017 World Women's Handball Championship in Germany was played over two rounds. The 2017 hosts Germany and the 2015 Champion Norway qualified automatically for the World Championship.

In the first round of qualification, the 15 teams who did not participate in the 2016 European Championship were split into four groups. The first and second placed teams from Groups 1–3 and the first placed team from Group 4 joined the eleven teams from the European Championship that did not qualify directly in a playoff to determine the nine teams that qualified for the 2017 World Championship.

Qualification phase 1

Seeding
The draw was held on 24 June 2016. The first and second placed teams from Group 1–3 and the group winner of Group 4 advanced to the playoff round.

All times are local.

Group 1

Group 2

Group 3

Group 4

Qualification phase 2
The draw was held on 17 December 2016 at Gothenburg. The teams played a home-and away series to determine the final tournament participants.

Seedings

Overview

|}

All times are local.

Matches

Montenegro won 56–51 on aggregate.

Serbia won 67–39 on aggregate.

Russia won 63–48 on aggregate.

Hungary won 52–43 on aggregate.

Romania won 67–53 on aggregate.

Spain won 46–44 on aggregate.

Slovenia won 55–51 on aggregate.

Czech Republic won 60–48 on aggregate.

Sweden won 77–47 on aggregate.

References

External links
Official website 

2016 in women's handball
2017 in women's handball
World Handball Championship tournaments
Qualification for handball competitions